The Church of Jesus Christ of Latter-day Saints in the Dominican Republic refers to the Church of Jesus Christ of Latter-day Saints (LDS Church) and its members in Dominican Republic. The LDS Church has had a presence in the Dominican Republic since 1978. With 145,397 members in 201 congregations, Dominican Republic has the largest body of LDS Church members in the Caribbean. It also has the highest members per capita rate in the Caribbean.

History

On 7 December 1978, the Dominican Republic was dedicated for the preaching of the doctrine of the Church of Jesus Christ of Later-day Saints by Apostle M. Russell Ballard. The first person baptized in the country was Rodolfo N. Bodden. Bodden had been introduced to the LDS Church by his friends Eddie and Mercedes Amparo, Dominican Mormons who had joined the LDS Church in New York City and had since returned to their home country, and John and Nancy Rappleye, an expatriate American couple from Utah. After his baptism, Bodden held several leadership callings in LDS Church in the Dominican Republic. He was a counselor to the country's first branch president and Bodden was the first district president in the Dominican Republic.

The first mission of the church in the Dominican Republic—the Dominican Republic Santo Domingo Mission—was created in 1981 when there were 2500 members in the country. By 1986, there were 11,000 members and the first stake of the church in the Dominican Republic was organized in Santo Domingo, with Bodden as the country's first stake patriarch. The second mission in the Dominican Republic was organized in Santiago on 1 July 1987.

Missions

Temples 

On 16 November 1993, the LDS Church announced that it would construct a temple in Santo Domingo. On 17 September 2000, church president Gordon B. Hinckley dedicated the Santo Domingo Dominican Republic Temple; it was the church's 99th operating temple and the first temple built in a Caribbean country.

Notes

Further reading
.

External links

 ComeUntoChrist.org Latter-day Saints Visitor site
 The Church of Jesus Christ of Latter-day Saints Official site